Alaba is a genus of sea snails, marine gastropod mollusks in the family Litiopidae.

Species
Species within the genus Alaba include:
 Alaba culliereti (Dautzenberg, 1891)
 Alaba guayaquilensis Bartsch, 1928
 Alaba hungerfordi G. B. Sowerby III, 1894
 Alaba incerta (d’Orbigny, 1841)
 Alaba interrupelineata Pilsbry & Lowe, 1932
 Alaba jeanettae Bartsch, 1910
 Alaba martensi Issel, 1869
 Alaba mirabilis (Hornung & Mermod, 1926)
 Alaba pinnae (Krauss, 1848)
 Alaba supralirata Carpenter, 1857
 Alaba zadela Melvill & Standen, 1896 
 Species brought into synonymy 
 Alaba albugo Watson, 1886: synonym of Diala albugo (Watson, 1886)
 Alaba catalinensis Bartsch, 1920: synonym of Pseudosabinella bakeri (Bartsch, 1917)
 Alaba fulva Watson, 1886: synonym of Finella rufocincta (A. Adams, 1861)
 Alaba goniochila (A. Adams, 1860): synonym of Styliferina goniochila A. Adams, 1860
 Alaba incolorata Thiele, 1912: synonym of Bulimeulima incolorata (Thiele, 1912)
 Alaba leithii E.A. Smith, 1876: synonym of  Mainwaringia leithii (E.A. Smith, 1876)
 Alaba oldroydi Dall, 1905 : synonym of Lirobarleeia kelseyi (Dall & Bartsch, 1902)
 Alaba semistriata (Philippi, 1849): synonym of Diala semistriata (Philippi, 1849)
 Alaba serrana Smith & Gordon, 1948: synonym of Pseudosabinella bakeri (Bartsch, 1917)
 Alaba striata Watson, 1886: synonym of Finella pupoides Adams A., 1860
 Alaba sulcata Watson, 1886: synonym of Doxander campbelli (Griffith & Pidgeon, 1834)
 Alaba terebralis Carpenter, 1857: synonym of Microeulima terebralis (Carpenter, 1857)
 Alaba translucida (Hedley, 1905): synonym of Styliferina translucida (Hedley, 1905) 
 Alaba violacea Carpenter, 1857: synonym of Microeulima terebralis (Carpenter, 1857)

References

 Dautzenberg, Ph. (1890). Récoltes malacologiques de M. l'Abbé Culliéret aux Ïles Canaries et au Sénégal en janvier et février 1890. Mem. Soc. Zool. France III: 147-168, plate II, page(s): 166
 Vaught, K.C. (1989). A classification of the living Mollusca. American Malacologists: Melbourne, FL (USA). . XII, 195 pp.
 Gofas, S.; Le Renard, J.; Bouchet, P. (2001). Mollusca, in: Costello, M.J. et al. (Ed.) (2001). European register of marine species: a check-list of the marine species in Europe and a bibliography of guides to their identification. Collection Patrimoines Naturels, 50: pp. 180–213

External links

Litiopidae